Mecas menthae is a species of longhorn beetles found in Mexico and the United States. It was described by Chemsak and Linsley in 1973.

References

Saperdini
Beetles described in 1973